Kosmos 557 ( meaning Cosmos 557) was the designation given to DOS-3, the third space station in the Salyut program. It was originally intended to be launched as Salyut-3, but due to its failure to achieve orbit on May 11, 1973, three days before the launch of Skylab, it was renamed Kosmos-557.

Due to errors in the flight control system while out of the range of ground control, the station fired its attitude thruster until it consumed all of its attitude control fuel and became uncontrollable before raising its orbit to the desired altitude. Since the spacecraft was already in orbit and had been registered by Western radar, the Soviets disguised the launch as "Kosmos 557" and quietly allowed it to reenter Earth's atmosphere and burn up a week later. It was revealed to have been a Salyut station only much later.

See also 

 1973 in spaceflight

References

External links 
 NSSDC.GSFC.NASA
 Soviet Space Stations as Analogs – NASA report

1973 in spaceflight
1973 in the Soviet Union
Kosmos satellites
Salyut program
Spacecraft launched in 1973
Spacecraft which reentered in 1973